Ardeadoris poliahu is a species of sea slug, a dorid nudibranch, a shell-less marine gastropod mollusk in the family Chromodorididae.

Distribution 
This species is known only from the Hawaiian Islands.

References

Chromodorididae
Gastropods described in 1989